Catharine Esther Beecher (September 6, 1800 – May 12, 1878) was an American educator known for her forthright opinions on female education as well as her vehement support of the many benefits of the incorporation of kindergarten into children's education. She published the advice manual The American Woman's Home with her sister Harriet Beecher Stowe in 1869. Some sources spell her first name as "Catherine".

Biography

Early life and education
Beecher was born September 6, 1800, in East Hampton, New York, the daughter of outspoken minister and religious leader Lyman Beecher and Roxana (Foote) Beecher. Among her siblings were writer and abolitionist Harriet Beecher Stowe, along with clergymen Henry Ward Beecher and Charles Beecher. Beecher was educated at home until she was ten years old, when she was sent to Litchfield Female Academy in Litchfield, Connecticut, where she was taught the limited curriculum available to young women. The experience left her longing for additional opportunities for education. She taught herself subjects not commonly offered to women, including math, Latin, and philosophy. She took over the domestic duties of her household at the age of 16, following her mother's death. Beecher became a teacher in 1821 at a school in New Haven, Connecticut. Catharine was engaged to marry Alexander M. Fisher, head of the Mathematics Department at Yale College, but he died at sea before the wedding took place. Heartbroken, she never married.

Female seminary
To provide educational opportunities for others, in 1823 Beecher opened the Hartford Female Seminary in Hartford, Connecticut, where she taught until 1832. The private girls' school had many well-known alumnae.

Comprehending the deficiencies of existing textbooks, she prepared, primarily for use in her own school, some elementary books in arithmetic, a work on theology, and one on mental and moral philosophy. The last was never published, although printed and used as a college textbook.

She was constantly making experiments, and practicing them upon the girls, weighing all their food before they ate it, holding that Graham flour and the Graham diet were better for them than richer food. Ten of her pupils invited her to dine with them at a restaurant. She accepted the invitation, and the excellent dinner changed her views. Thereafter they were served with more palatable food.

Opposition to Indian Removal Bill 
In 1829 and 1830, Beecher led a women's movement to protest the Indian Removal Bill of President Andrew Jackson. The protest was the first national campaign on the part of women in the United States.

In the bill, Jackson requested that Congress approve the use of federal money to resettle southeastern American Indians, including the Cherokee, to land west of the Mississippi River. In response, Beecher published a "Circular Addressed to the Benevolent Ladies of the U. States", dated December 25, 1829, calling on women to send petitions to Congress protesting the removal. In the circular, she wrote, "It has become almost a certainty that these people are to have their lands torn from them, and to be driven into western wilds and to final annihilation, unless the feelings of a humane and Christian nation shall be aroused to prevent the unhallowed sacrifice."

Congress nevertheless passed the bill, and the Indian Removal Act became law on May 28, 1830.

Midlife in the West
In 1832, Beecher moved with her father to Cincinnati to campaign for more schools and teachers in the frontier. There she opened a female seminary, which, on account of her failing health, was discontinued after two years. She then devoted herself to the development of an extended plan for the physical, social, intellectual, and moral education of women, to be promoted through a national board. For nearly 40 years, she labored perseveringly in this work, organizing societies for training teachers, establishing plans for supplying the territories with good educators, writing, pleading, and traveling. Her object, as she described it, was "to unite American women in an effort to provide a Christian education for 2,000,000 children in our country." She made her field of labor especially in the West and South, and sought the aid of educated women throughout the United States.

Later life and death
In 1837, Beecher retired from administrative work. After returning East she started The Ladies' Society for Promoting Education in the West. In 1847 she co-founded the Board of National Popular Education with William Slade, a former Congressman and then governor of Vermont. In 1852 she founded the American Women's Educational Association. Their goal was to recruit and train teachers for frontier schools and send women into the West to civilize the young. Their efforts became a model for future schools developed in the West.

It was claimed that hundreds of the best teachers the West received were sent under the patronage of this system. To a certain extent the plans succeeded, and were found beneficial, but the careers of the teachers were mostly short, for they soon married.

In The American Woman's Home, published in 1869, Beecher and her sister presented a model home from a woman's perspective. The kitchen was inspired by a cook's galley in a steamship. A movable partition on wheels provided flexibility and privacy in the small home, and also served as a wardrobe. Chapters of the book discussing ventilation and heating anticipated modern central heating.

On May 12, 1878, Beecher died from apoplexy.

Views on and advocacy of education
In 1841 Beecher published A Treatise on Domestic Economy for the Use of Young Ladies at Home and at School, a book that discussed the underestimated importance of women's roles in society. The book was edited and re-released the following year in its final form. Catharine Beecher was a strong advocate of the inclusion of daily physical education in women's schooling, and developed a program of calisthenics performed to music.

In 1831, Catharine Beecher suggested that teachers read aloud to students from passages by writers with elegant styles, "to accustom the ear to the measurement of the sentences and the peculiar turns of expression".
She went on to have the students imitate the piece just read using similar words, style, and turns of phrase in order to develop "a ready command of the language and easy modes of expression". In 1846, Beecher pronounced that women, not men, should educate children, and established schools for training teachers in Western cities. She advocated that young ladies find godly work as Christian teachers away from the larger Eastern cities. The Board of National Popular Education, which was her idea, trained teachers in four-week sessions in Connecticut and then sent them out West. She believed that women had a higher calling to shape children and society.

Views on education
Beecher recognized public schools' responsibility to influence the moral, physical, and intellectual development of children. She promoted the expansion and development of teacher training programs, holding that teaching was more important to society than lawyers or doctors. Beecher was a strong advocate of the inclusion of daily physical education, and developed a program of calisthenics that was performed to music. She also firmly believed in the benefits of reading aloud.

Women as educators
Beecher believed that women have inherent qualities that make them the preferred gender as teachers. As men left teaching to pursue business and industry, she saw the untapped potential of educated women and encouraged education of women to fill the increasing need for teachers. She considered women natural teachers, with teaching as an extension of their domestic role.

Influential changes over time

In 1862, John Brinsley recommended that students analyze and imitate classical Greek and Latin models, while Beecher recommended English writers. They both believed that frequent practice and the study of important authors helped students acquire writing skills.

Beecher founded The American Woman's Educational Association in 1852, an organization focused on furthering educational opportunities for women. She also founded the Western Female Institute in Cincinnati (along with her father Lyman) and The Ladies Society for Promoting Education in the West. She was also instrumental in the establishment of women's colleges in Burlington, Iowa; Quincy, Illinois; and Milwaukee, Wisconsin.

Beecher strongly supported allowing children to simply be children and not prematurely forcing adulthood onto them. She believed that children lacked the experience needed to make important life decisions and that in order for them to become healthy self-sufficient adults, they needed to be allowed to express themselves freely in an environment suited to children. It was these beliefs that led to her support of a system of kindergartens.

Anti-suffragist
Beecher thought that women could best influence society as mothers and teachers, and did not want women to be corrupted by the evils of politics. She felt that men and women were put on the earth for separate reasons and accepted the view that women should not be involved in politics, but rather, they would teach male children to be free thinkers and moral learners and help shape their political ideas. (See Culture of Domesticity.)

Legacy
Three universities named buildings for Beecher: Central Connecticut State University, The University of Connecticut, and The University of Cincinnati. The Cincinnati building has since been demolished.

Schools
1823: Hartford Female Seminary: Beecher co-founded the Hartford Female Seminary, which was a school to train women to be mothers and teachers. It began with one room and seven students; within three years, it grew to almost 100 students, with 10 rooms and 8 teachers. The school had small class sizes, where advanced students taught other students. All classes were connected to general principles, and students were motivated to go beyond the classes' texts and instruction.
1832: Western Female Institute
1852: The Ladies Society for Promoting Education in the West founded colleges in Burlington, Iowa; Quincy, Illinois; and Milwaukee, Wisconsin. The Milwaukee Female College changed names several times. Today, as Downer College of Lawrence University of Appleton WI, it is the longest continuously operating college for women's higher education founded on the Beecher plan.

Selected works

 
 
  
 
 
 
 
 
 
 
 , an account of an infelicitous domestic affair in which some of her friends were involved
 
 
 
 , a book containing many striking departures from Calvinistic theology

Further reading
 Dolores Hayden. "Catharine Beecher and the Politics of Housework", featured in Women in American Architecture: A Historic and Contemporary Perspective. New York City: Watson-Guptill, 1977.
 Grace Norton Kieckhefer. The History of Milwaukee-Downer College 1851–1951. MDC Series 33-2. Milwaukee: Centennial Publication, Nov. 1950.
 Carolyn King Stephens. Downer Women, 1851–2001. Milwaukee: Sea King Publishing, 2003.

References

Bibliography
Ohles, John F. Biographical Dictionary of American Educators Vol 1. Greenwood Press. London, England. 1978.
Rugoff, Milton. The Beechers: An American family in the nineteenth century. Harper & Row. New York. 1981.
White, Barbara. The Beecher Sisters. Yale University Press. London. 2003.

External links

Archives 

 Beecher family collection from Princeton University Library. Special Collections
Beecher family papers at Mount Holyoke College Archives and Special Collections
Beecher family papers at Yale University Library

Other links 
 
 
 
 An American Family: The Beecher Tradition https://web.archive.org/web/20031125234259/http://newman.baruch.cuny.edu/DIGITAL/2001/beecher/catherine.htm. Accessed 1/21/10
 PBS Schoolhouse Pioneers
 Neman Library: The American Beecher Family Tradition
 PBS:The Story of American Public Education
 Lawrence University
 Michals, Debra. "Catherine Esther Beecher". National Women's History Museum. 2015

1800 births
1878 deaths
People from East Hampton (town), New York
American women's rights activists
Beecher family
Milwaukee-Downer College faculty
Activists from New York (state)
Anti-suffragists
Place of death missing